Ying Chang Compestine (born March 8, 1963) is a Chinese American author, speaker, television host and chef. She has written over twenty books including Revolution Is Not a Dinner Party (novel), based on her life growing up during the Chinese Cultural Revolution., and a middle grade novel, Morning Sun in Wuhan, set in Wuhan, China.

Biography 
Ying Chang Compestine was born and raised in Wuhan, China. Her family was considered "bourgeois," so the Red Guard took her family's belongings and her father was put in jail twice. Because of the family's difficulties, Compestine was sent to live with her grandparents.

Compestine earned a degree in English and American literature and taught English in China. She also worked as an interpreter for China's Bureau of Seismology.

Compestine graduated with a master's degree in Sociology from the University of Colorado, Boulder in 1990. She met her husband just before she finished graduate school.

Career 
After immigrating to the United States, Compestine taught sociology and writing at universities in both the U.S. and China. Compestine has received various education awards including the Master Teacher Award from both Front Range Community College (1991-1992) and the International School of Beijing (2000).

Compestine has hosted several cooking shows on Chinese Language News Broadcaster for Phoenix North America Chinese Channel, as well as appearing as a guest on the Food Network, Discovery Channel, and HGTV. She also worked a food editor for Martha Stewart’s Body + Soul magazine and is a contributor for Cooking Light, EatingWell, Self, and Men's Health. Compestine is also a spokesperson for Nestle and Celestial Seasonings.

Writing career 
Compestine began writing after her son was born, creating the cookbook, Secrets of Fat-Free Chinese Cooking (1997). She began writing children's books after her parents died, because she missed China and her family. Since then she has written numerous children's books, and is actively writing today.

Her book Revolution is Not a Dinner Party (2007) is based on her life growing up in China. The book has been featured on several lists, such as the 2008 American Library Association's (ALA) Best Books for Young Readers, and Publishers Weekly's best children's books for 2007.

Compestine co-authored Secrets of The Terra Cotta Soldier, with her son Vinson in 2014.

Her children's book The Chinese Emperor's New Clothes (2018) illustrated by David Roberts, has received praise from Publishers Weekly, The Guardian, and The San Francisco Chronicle.  It was rated as one of the "best new picture books" by The Children's Book Review in 2018.

She has an upcoming middle grade novel, Morning Sun in Wuhan. Clarion Books, an imprint of HarperCollins, will publish the novel, which has received praise from readers and literary organizations such as Bulletin of the Center for Children's Books.

She has two upcoming picture books: Little Red Riding Hood and the Dragon, a fairy tale retelling set in China, and Dragon Noodle Party.

Publications 
 The Chinese Red Riding Hood. Abrams Books for Young Readers. Release date: 2021
 D is for Dragon Dance (Chinese/English bilingual edition). Holiday House. Release date: Fall 2018
 Revolution Is Not a Dinner Party (German translation). Verlagshaus Jacoby & Stuart. Release date: Summer 2018

Awards

References

External links 

Ying Chang Compestine

1963 births
Living people
American motivational speakers
American historical novelists
American people of Chinese descent
American cookbook writers
American children's writers
21st-century Chinese women writers
20th-century Chinese women writers
21st-century Chinese writers
20th-century Chinese writers
20th-century American women writers
21st-century American writers
21st-century American women
Women cookbook writers